The episodes of Loveless are based on the manga of the same name by Yun Kōga. The twelve episodes anime adaptation was made by J.C. STAFF, and first aired in Japan from April 2005 to June 2005. The opening theme music is "Tsuki no Curse" by Okina Reika and the ending is "Michiyuki" by Kaori Hikida; both were composed by Yuki Kajiura and arranged by Masayuki Sakamoto. Media Blasters licensed and released an English subtitled version in early 2006.

Episode list

DVD releases
Bandai Entertainment released six Region 2 DVD compilations, each containing two episodes, from July 22, 2005 to December 23, 2005. A limited edition six-disc boxed set was released on June 25, 2008; it included an unreleased drama CD and a booklet.

References

Loveless
Yun Kōga